Talk to Me is the fifth solo album by Joey McIntyre, a member of New Kids on the Block. The album consists of cover versions of classic songs previously recorded by Frank Sinatra and other singers. From December 19, 2006, to February 11, 2007, McIntyre went on the 38 city smash hit tour, Dancing with the Stars - The Tour performing "Come Dance With Me" with dancers and "The Way You Look Tonight" with the band. During the eight weeks tour, the album sold 10,000 copies.

Track listing
"The Way You Look Tonight" (Dorothy Fields, Jerome Kern: ALDI Music Co.)
"I Get a Kick Out of You" (Cole Porter: Warner Chappell Music, Inc.)
"My Funny Valentine" (Lorenz Hart, Richard Rodgers:  Warner Chappell Music, Inc.)
"Bewitched" (Lorenz Hart, Richard Rodgers:  Warner Chappell Music, Inc.)
"Come Dance with Me"  (Sammy Cahn, Jimmy Van Heusen:  WB Music Corp., Maraville Music Corp.)
"Talk to Me" (Eddie Snyder, S. Kahan, Rudy Vallee: Barton Music Corp.)
"Makin' Whoopee" (Walter Donaldson, Gus Kahn: Donaldson Publishing Co,. Keyes Gilbert Music Co., Larry Spier Music LLC, Tobago Music Co.)
"Moon River" (Henry Mancini, Johnny Mercer:  Famous Music LLC)
"Come Rain or Come Shine" (Harold Arlen, Johnny Mercer:  Warner Chappell Music Inc., S.A. Music Co.)
"I've Got the World on a String" (Harold Arlen, Ted Koehler:  S.A. Music Co., BUGHOUSE)
"All the Way" (Sammy Cahn,  Jimmy Van Heusen:  Maraville Music Corp.)

Personnel 
Joey McIntyre: lead vocals
Doug Petty: piano, organ, accordion, Wurlitzer
Dan Petty: guitar
Brian Bromberg: bass guitar
Vinnie Colaiuta: drums
Engineered by: Tom McCauley
Additional engineering: Don Petty
Pro-Tools digital editing: Pat Thrall, David Channing and Jeff Bova
Recorded at: B2 STUDIOS, Los Angeles and The Path Studios, Los Angeles
Mixed by: Bill Schnee
Assistant mix engineer:  Darius Fong
Mixed at: Schnee Studios, Los Angeles
Mastered by: Doug Sax and Sangwook Nam at the Mastering Lab, Ojai, California
Art concept, art direction and photography:  Roxann Arwen Mills
Design: Scott Matz
Wardrobe stylist: Roman Diaz

2006 albums
Joey McIntyre albums
Albums produced by Emanuel Kiriakou